Psalm 56 is the 56th psalm of the Book of Psalms, beginning in English in the King James Version: "Be merciful unto me, O God: for man would swallow me up". In the slightly different numbering system of the Greek Septuagint version of the Bible and the Latin Vulgate, this psalm is Psalm 55. In Latin, it is known as "Miserere mei Deus quoniam conculcavit me homo". The psalm is the first of a series of five psalms in this part of the book which are referred to as Miktams. It is attributed to King David and may be considered representative of him or anyone else hiding from an enemy.

The psalm forms a regular part of Jewish, Catholic, Lutheran, Anglican and other Protestant liturgies. It has been set to music.

Text

Hebrew Bible version
Following is the Hebrew text of Psalm 56:

King James Version
The following is the full English text of the Psalm from the King James Bible.
To the chief Musician upon Jonath-elem-rechokim, Michtam of David, when the Philistines took him in Gath.
 Be merciful unto me, O God: for man would swallow me up; he fighting daily oppresseth me.
 Mine enemies would daily swallow me up: for they be many that fight against me, O thou most High.
 What time I am afraid, I will trust in thee.
 In God I will praise his word, in God I have put my trust; I will not fear what flesh can do unto me.
 Every day they wrest my words: all their thoughts are against me for evil.
 They gather themselves together, they hide themselves, they mark my steps, when they wait for my soul.
 Shall they escape by iniquity? in thine anger cast down the people, O God.
 Thou tellest my wanderings: put thou my tears into thy bottle: are they not in thy book?
 When I cry unto thee, then shall mine enemies turn back: this I know; for God is for me.
 In God will I praise his word: in the LORD will I praise his word.
 In God have I put my trust: I will not be afraid what man can do unto me.
 Thy vows are upon me, O God: I will render praises unto thee.
 For thou hast delivered my soul from death: wilt not thou deliver my feet from falling, that I may walk before God in the light of the living?

Heading
In the Hebrew Bible, Psalm 56:1 comprises the designation
To the chief Musician upon Jonath-elem-rechokim, Michtam of David, when the Philistines took him in Gath. (KJV)
rendered in the New King James Version as "Set to 'The Silent Dove in Distant Lands'." From then on verses 1–13 in English versions correspond to verses 2–14 in the Hebrew text. The heading in the Septuagint reads "for the people far off from the holy places (or holy people)", while the Targum has "concerning the congregation of Israel, which is compared to a silent dove at the time when they were far from their cities, and turned again and praised the Lord of the world'".

Commentary
It is a prayer for help against enemies, ascribed to royal rites, as indicated by the interpretation of the 'peoples' in verse 7 as foreign enemies, the references to national war in verses 1–2, 9, as well as the vows and thank-offerings (verse 12) which are particularly suitable for a king, and the references to 'death' and the 'light of life' (verse 13) are also linked to royal imagery.

Book of Common Prayer
In the Church of England's Book of Common Prayer, this psalm is appointed to be read on the morning of the 11th day of the month.

Musical settings 
Heinrich Schütz wrote a setting of a paraphrase of Psalm 40 in German, "Herr Gott, erzeig mir Hülf und Gnad", SWV 153, for the Becker Psalter, published first in 1628. Mendelssohn used a verse in German for the text of the third movement from his Lobgesang. Alan Hovhaness set text from this Psalm, as well as Psalms 54 and 55, in his 1966 work Make a Joyful Noise.

References

External links 

 
 
  in Hebrew and English - Mechon-mamre
 Text of Psalm 56 according to the 1928 Psalter
 For the director. According to Yonath elem rehoqim. A miktam of David, when the Philistines seized him at Gath. / Have mercy on me, God, for I am treated harshly text and footnotes, usccb.org United States Conference of Catholic Bishops
 Psalm 56:1 introduction and text, biblestudytools.com
 Psalm 56 – Faith in the Midst of Fear enduringword.com
 Psalm 56 / Refrain: In God I trust, and will not fear. Church of England
 Psalm 56 at biblegateway.com
 Hymns for Psalm 56 hymnary.org

056
Works attributed to David